Bram Stoker's Dracula may refer to:

Dracula, a 1897 English-language novel by Irish author Bram Stoker
Dracula's Guest and Other Weird Stories, a 1914 collection of short stories by Bram Stoker
Bram Stoker's Dracula (1974 film), a 1974 telefilm by Dan Curtis
Bram Stoker's Dracula (1992 film), a 1992 American gothic horror film
Bram Stoker's Dracula (soundtrack), for the 1992 film
Bram Stoker's Dracula (video game), 1992 video game adaptations of the 1992 film
Bram Stoker's Dracula (handheld video game), 1992 game for the Game Boy
 Bram Stoker's Dracula (pinball), a 1993 pinball machine based on the 1992 film
Bram Stoker's Dracula, a four-issue Topps comic book adaptation of the 1992 film by Mike Mignola